Meenakshi Kalyanam is a 1998 Indian Malayalam film,  directed by Jose Thomas and produced by Davi Rafel and Prince Rafel. The film stars Mukesh, Mohini and Jagathy Sreekumar in the lead roles,one of the superhit movie in 1998.The film has musical score by C. Rajamani and songs by Nadirsha.

Cast

Mukesh as Eerali Balan
Mohini as Meenakshi
Jagathy Sreekumar as Vasu
Kalabhavan Mani as Pushkaran
Kalabhavan Navas as Unnikrishnan
Oduvil Unnikrishnan as Adv. Eashwara Pilla
Salim Kumar as  Adv. Sivan Mullassery 
Baiju as Wilson
Augustine as SI Puli Chacko
Sadiq as Vishwanathan
Sukumari as Janaki, Vanitha commission chairperson
Baiju Ezhupunna
Chali Pala as Janardhanan Nair
KPAC Sabu
Sreejaya as Lakshmi
Ramya Sudha as Asha
V. K. Sreeraman as Madhavan Thampi
Manka Mahesh as Kousalya

Soundtrack
The music was composed by C. Rajamani and Nadirsha, with the former composing the film score and later the songs. The lyrics for songs were written by Arumughan Vengidangu, S. Ramesan Nair and Joffy Tharakan.

References

External links
 

1998 films
1990s Malayalam-language films
Films directed by Jose Thomas
Films scored by Nadirshah
Films shot in Thrissur